Priapatius (also spelled Phriapatius or Phriapites;  Friyapāt), was the Arsacid king of Parthia from 191 BC to 176 BC. He was the cousin and successor of Arsaces II. Like many Arsacid monarchs, his reign is sparsely known. His coinage indicates that he managed to rid himself of the influence of the Seleucid Empire. He was succeeded by his son Phraates I.

Background 
According to the modern historian Mehrdad Kia, Priapatius was most likely the son of his predecessor, Arsaces II, who was in turn the son of Arsaces I, the founder of the dynasty. However, this is unlikely, as newly found contemporary Parthian ostracons call him a son of the nephew of Arsaces I. Efforts have been made by scholars to reconstruct the early genealogy of the Arsacids, which calls Priapatius the grandson of Tiridates, the brother of Arsaces. However, numismatic data and recent analysis of sources have led to the conclusion that the character of Tiridates is fictional.

Reign 
Regardless of his precise ancestry, Priapatius succeeded Arsaces II in 191 BC. Like many Arsacid rulers, not much is known about Priapatius. His coinage in terms of style followed the same model as that of his predecessors. The obverse shows a beardless portrait of him wearing a soft cap (bashlyk), whilst the reverse shows him carrying a bow.

The adoption of these titles were most likely associated with the Arsacid reconquest of the lands lost to the Seleucid king Antiochus III the Great, who had in 210 BC made a large-scale expedition in the east, including Hyrcania. There, he possibly compelled Arsaces II to abandon his right to mint coins freely. Afterwards, however, the fragility of the Seleucid Empire gave Arsaces II and later Priapatius the opportunity to resume having their coins minted freely. Like the rest of the Arsacid kings, Priapatius used the title of Arsaces on his coinage, which was the name of the first Arsacid ruler Arsaces I, which had become a royal honorific among the Arsacid monarchs out of admiration for his achievements.

Priapatius was the father of three Arsacid kings, Phraates I, who was his oldest son and successor, Mithridates I, and Artabanus I.

References

Sources

Further reading 
 

176 BC deaths
2nd-century BC Parthian monarchs
2nd-century BC rulers in Asia
Year of birth unknown
2nd-century BC Iranian people